The European Tour 2013/2014 – Event 2 (also known as the 2013 Rotterdam Open) was a professional minor-ranking snooker tournament that took place between 18 and 21 July 2013 at the Topsport Centrum in Rotterdam, Netherlands. This was the second ever professional snooker tournament in the Netherlands after the 1991 European Open.

Mark Williams won his 25th professional title by defeating Mark Selby 4–3 in the final.

Prize fund and ranking points
The breakdown of prize money and ranking points of the event is shown below:

1 Only professional players can earn ranking points.

Main draw

Preliminary rounds

Round 1
Best of 7 frames

Round 2
Best of 7 frames

Main rounds

Top half

Section 1

Section 2

Section 3

Section 4

Bottom half

Section 5

Section 6

Section 7

Section 8

Finals

Century breaks

 142  Matthew Selt
 140, 129, 102  Ryan Day
 140  Rod Lawler
 137, 107  Martin Gould
 137  Stuart Carrington
 136, 132, 115, 111  Mark Selby
 136, 116  Mark Williams
 135  Jimmy Robertson
 132, 100  Fergal O'Brien
 131  Tom Ford
 130  Stephen Maguire
 125, 113  Judd Trump
 125  Martin O'Donnell
 123, 105  Ricky Walden
 119  Hammad Miah

 116, 104  Daniel Wells
 116  Joe Perry
 113  Gareth Allen
 113  Jamie Cope
 111  Robbie Williams
 109, 104, 101  John Higgins
 108, 104  Sam Baird
 107, 104  Anthony McGill
 106  David Gilbert
 103  Sydney Wilson
 100  Jeff Cundy
 100  Michael Georgiou
 100  Luca Brecel
 100  Jamie O'Neill
 100  Mark Joyce

References

External links
 2013 Rotterdam Open – Pictures by Corné Kuijpers at Facebook

ET2
2013 in Dutch sport